Suzan Murad (born January 9, 2003), known professionally as Suzanitta, is a Bulgarian chalga singer.

Early life 
Suzanitta's father is Orhan  Murad, a Bulgarian Turk pop-folk singer. She has been making music videos since 2012. Her 2017 music video with Andrea had more than 6.8 million views on YouTube.

In 2017 she made the song "" (Lucifer and Buddha) and became one of the most commented-on Bulgarian singers. Later in 2017 she created a song with Andrea.

Discography

Singles

As lead artist

As featured artist

References 

Bulgarian pop singers
Bulgarian folk-pop singers
Bulgarian child singers
Contemporary R&B singers
Living people
21st-century Bulgarian singers
2003 births
Bulgarian people of Turkish descent